Regius Professor of Physiology is the title of a chair held at a two universities in Scotland. See:

 Regius Professor of Physiology (Aberdeen), for the University of Aberdeen
 Regius Professor of Physiology (Glasgow), for the University of Glasgow

See also
 Regius Professor, for similar professorships